In classical mechanics, the parameters that define the configuration of a system are called generalized coordinates, and the space defined by these coordinates is called the configuration space of the physical system.  It is often the case that these parameters satisfy mathematical constraints, such that the set of actual configurations of the system is a manifold in the space of generalized coordinates.  This manifold is called the configuration manifold of the system. Notice that this is a notion of "unrestricted" configuration space, i.e. in which different point particles may occupy the same position. In mathematics, in particular in topology, a notion of "restricted" configuration space is mostly used, in which the diagonals, representing "colliding" particles, are removed.

Example: a particle in 3D space
It is conventional to use the symbol  for a point in configuration space; this is the convention in both the Hamiltonian formulation of classical mechanics, and in Lagrangian mechanics. The symbol  is used to denote momenta; the symbol  refers to velocities.

A particle might be constrained to move on a specific manifold. For example, if the particle is attached to a rigid linkage, free to swing about the origin, it is effectively constrained to lie on a sphere. Its configuration space is the subset of coordinates in  that define points on the sphere . In this case, one says that the manifold  is the sphere, i.e. .

In general, however, one is interested in the case where the particles interact: for example, they are specific locations in some assembly of gears, pulleys, rolling balls, etc. often constrained to move without slipping.

Example: rigid body in 3D space
The set of coordinates that define the position of a reference point and the orientation of a coordinate frame attached to a rigid body in three-dimensional space form its configuration space, often denoted  where  represents the coordinates of the origin of the frame attached to the body, and  represents the rotation matrices that define the orientation of this frame relative to a ground frame.

In this case, the configuration space  is six-dimensional, and a point  is just a point in that space. There is no canonical choice of coordinates; one could also choose some tip or endpoint of the rigid body, instead of its center of mass; one might choose to use quaternions instead of Euler angles, and so on. However, the parameterization does not change the mechanical characteristics of the system; all of the different parameterizations ultimately describe the same (six-dimensional) manifold, the same set of possible positions and orientations. 

Some parameterizations are easier to work with than others, and many important statements can be made by working in a coordinate-free fashion.  Examples of coordinate-free statements are that the tangent space  corresponds to the velocities of the points , while the cotangent space  corresponds to momenta. (Velocities and momenta can be connected; for the most general, abstract case, this is done with the rather abstract notion of the tautological one-form.)

Example: robotic arm

For a robotic arm consisting of numerous rigid linkages, the configuration space consists of the location of each linkage (taken to be a rigid body, as in the section above), subject to the constraints of how the linkages are attached to each other, and their allowed range of motion. Thus, for  linkages, one might consider the total space

except that all of the various attachments and constraints mean that not every point in this space is reachable.  Thus, the configuration space  is necessarily a subspace of the -rigid-body configuration space. 

Note, however, that in robotics, the term configuration space can also refer to a further-reduced subset: the set of reachable positions by a robot's end-effector. This definition, however, leads to complexities described by the holonomy: that is, there may be several different ways of arranging a robot arm to obtain a particular end-effector location, and it is even possible to have the robot arm move while keeping the end effector stationary. Thus, a complete description of the arm, suitable for use in kinematics, requires the specification of all of the joint positions and angles, and not just some of them.

The joint parameters of the robot are used as generalized coordinates to define configurations.  The set of joint parameter values is called the joint space.  A robot's forward and inverse kinematics equations define maps between configurations and end-effector positions, or between joint space and configuration space.  Robot motion planning uses this mapping to find a path in joint space that provides an achievable route in the configuration space of the end-effector.

Formal definition 
In classical mechanics, the configuration of a system consists of the positions had by all components subject to kinematical constraints.

Phase space
The configuration space is insufficient to completely describe a mechanical system: it fails to take into account velocities. The set of velocities available to a system defines a plane tangent to the configuration manifold of the system. The set of positions and momenta of a mechanical system forms the cotangent bundle  of the configuration manifold . This larger manifold is called the phase space of the system.

State space 
In quantum mechanics, the analogous concept is called the state space. A rather different set of formalisms and notation are used in this case. It is complex, because a quantum-mechanical wave function has a complex phase; it is projective because the wave-function is normalized to unit probability. That is, given a wave-function  one is free to normalize it by the total probability , thus making it projective.

See also
Feature space (topic in pattern recognition)
Parameter space
Configuration space (mathematics)

References

External links
 Intuitive Explanation of Classical Configuration Spaces.
 Interactive Visualization of the C-space for a Robot Arm with Two Rotational Links from UC Berkeley.
 Configuration Space Visualization from Free University of Berlin
 Configuration Spaces, Braids, and Robotics from Robert Ghrist

Classical mechanics